Corrosion of Conformity (also known as COC) is an American heavy metal band from Raleigh, North Carolina, formed in 1982. The band has undergone multiple lineup changes throughout its existence, with guitarist Woody Weatherman as the sole constant member. Weatherman, founding bassist Mike Dean, founding drummer Reed Mullin and vocalist/guitarist Pepper Keenan (who joined the band in 1989) are widely regarded as its 'classic' lineup. After a hiatus in 2006, Corrosion of Conformity returned in 2010 without Keenan, who had been busy touring and recording with Down, but announced their reunion with him in December 2014.

The band started as a hardcore punk band but later moved towards a slower and blues-tinged heavy metal sound. To date, the band has released ten studio albums, four EPs, one compilation, and one live album. Their first three studio albums―Eye for an Eye (1984), Animosity (1985) and Blind (1991)―attracted the attention of Columbia Records, who signed the band in 1993. Corrosion of Conformity found success with the release of their 1994 fourth studio album, Deliverance, which peaked at number 155 on the Billboard 200 and spawned the hits "Albatross" and "Clean My Wounds". Their 1996 follow-up Wiseblood was also successful, and at the time, it was the band's highest-charting album in the United States, peaking at number 104 on the Billboard 200. Their latest album, No Cross No Crown, was released in 2018 and became the band's first album to enter the top 100 on the Billboard 200, where it peaked at number 67.

History

Early years, Eye for an Eye and Animosity (1982–1987)

Corrosion of Conformity was formed in Raleigh, North Carolina, by bassist and vocalist Mike Dean, guitarist Woody Weatherman, drummer Reed Mullin, and singer Benji Shelton in 1982. They were influenced by heavy metal bands like Black Sabbath, Iron Maiden, Scorpions, and Judas Priest, as well as by hardcore groups like Black Flag, Bad Brains, Circle Jerks, Minor Threat, Discharge, and Germs.

They released tracks on the No Core cassette tape compilation on the label of the same name along with other North Carolina punk bands in 1982 as well as on the "Why are we here?" 7" compilation in 1983, also on the No Core label. Shelton quit the band in 1983 and COC first recruited Robert Stewart to sing but he stayed only for about a month, so they recruited Eric Eycke from fellow Raleigh band Colcor to be the new singer. They recorded their first album, "Eye for an Eye", with Eycke.

Their hardcore punk-oriented 20-track debut Eye for an Eye—the only album featuring Eycke—was initially released in 1984 and later re-released by Caroline Records in 1989. Soon after, Eycke left the band and COC continued as a three-piece with Dean and Mullin sharing vocal duties on 1985's follow-up Animosity. In 1987, COC recruited Simon Bob Sinister after the breakup of their fellow Carolina band and Death Records labelmates Ugly Americans. The band's 1987 release, Technocracy, featured the hectic crossover thrash musicianship of COC with a cleaner vocal style than they had in the past.

Departure of Mike Dean, hiatus and Blind (1987–1992)

Mike Dean departed in 1987 and Simon Bob soon followed, leaving COC in a state of flux for a couple of years. The remaining members re-tuned the lineup and searched for a new vocalist, even posting a classified in Flipside Fanzine for a singer similar in sound to "James Hetfield or Ozzy Osbourne" to go with their new metal sound. Caroline Records released some old tracks with Mike singing during this time with the aptly named Six Songs with Mike Singing EP.

Mike Dean also participated in Snake Nation.

After much searching, Karl Agell was recruited on vocals, Phil Swisher on bass and Pepper Keenan as a second guitarist. The new lineup released 1991's Blind, gravitating towards a sludge/groove metal sound. Blind was the first COC album to receive mainstream attention. The video for "Vote with a Bullet" (the only song with Keenan on vocals on the album) received airplay on MTV and the album cracked the Billboard Heatseekers chart in early 1992. The album has sold around 250,000 copies in the United States to date.

Deliverance and Wiseblood (1993–1998)
In 1993, Agell and Swisher left the band and formed the band Leadfoot, Dean returned and Keenan took over lead vocals.

The band began working on their next album for Relativity, Deliverance. During this time however, session demos for the album found their way into the hands of Columbia Records. The label then offered to buy the band's contract from Relativity; when the label refused, Sony/Columbia bought Relativity, turned it into a distribution label, and transferred the band's contract over to Columbia.

Deliverance saw the band also incorporating stoner and Southern rock influences, which they also carried onto the following albums. In 1994, their song Big Problems was featured on the Clerks soundtrack. The song "Clean My Wounds" was featured in the anime movie Tekken: The Motion Picture.

Deliverance was the band's biggest selling album. This was mainly due to the singles "Albatross" and "Clean My Wounds" becoming Top 20 hits on rock radio and the album managed to spend almost four months on the Billboard 200, peaking at No. 155. On the Heatseekers chart, it peaked at No. 5 and lasted almost a year on that particular chart. US sales for the album were just over 440,000 by the end of 2005 and this album should be eligible for Gold status within the next few years.

Wiseblood was released in October 1996. Despite producing a Top 30 radio hit with "Drowning in a Daydream" and a worldwide tour with Metallica, the album failed to match the sales set by the previous album. Total US sales to date are just over 150,000. "Drowning in a Daydream" was nominated at the Grammy Awards in 1998 for "Best Metal Performance".

America's Volume Dealer and In the Arms of God (1999–2006)

Soon after the release of Wiseblood, Columbia dropped COC, who then moved to Sanctuary Records. The band released its first album for its new label, America's Volume Dealer, in November 2000. The album was even more of a commercial failure than Wiseblood not even managing to make the Billboard 200. However, the single, "Congratulations Song", did give the band another Top 30 hit. No videos were made from the album. Mullin left the band in 2001. Over the next few years, the band worked with a series of drummers: Jimmy Bower of Eyehategod, local Raleigh percussion professor Merritt Partridge, Stanton Moore of Galactic and Reed's former drum technician Jason Patterson, who previously played drums in the Raleigh-based rock band Cry of Love.

In April 2005, COC released In the Arms of God to much critical acclaim. The album performed much better than their previous effort, debuting at No. 108 on the Billboard 200 and even topping the Heatseekers chart. This was achieved without even one radio hit from the album. A video was made for the song "Stonebreaker" which saw airplay on MTV2's recently revived Headbanger's Ball. The band spent the rest of the year touring the US and Canada. They were the opening acts for Motörhead and Disturbed and also went on headlining tours with Crowbar, Fu Manchu, Alabama Thunderpussy, and Danko Jones all providing support. A European tour was scheduled for September/October 2005 but was later canceled, after Hurricane Katrina ravaged Keenan's hometown of New Orleans. A co-headlining UK tour with Clutch commenced in January 2006.

Second hiatus (2006–2010)
Corrosion of Conformity was on hiatus from 2006 to June 2010, while Pepper recorded and toured with Down. From March 2009 to June 2010, Karl Agell and Reed Mullin occasionally performed with Jerry Barrett, Scott Little, and Jason Browning (Browning eventually replaced by TR Gwynne) as "COC-Blind", playing the Blind album. Reed Mullin and Mike Dean along with Jason Browning also toured in a new band called "Righteous Fool", and have released a self-titled EP through Southern Lord Records.

Animosity lineup reunion, Corrosion of Conformity and IX (2010–2014)

On May 12, 2010, Blabbermouth.net reported that the Animosity lineup of Corrosion of Conformity was reuniting and working on a new album. They are planning some early-August shows lined up for the West Coast, although they have not yet been officially announced.
The band is still open to recording again as a four-piece with Pepper when the time is right, according to a message on the official COC website on May 15, 2010. Pepper currently, has not officially left the band.

Pepper joined his band mates on stage on June 17, 2011, at the Hellfest (Clisson, France) to play "Vote with a Bullet" as well as on June 19, 2011, in Bilbao, Spain, where they additionally performed together on "Señor Limpio". Pepper stated that he looks forward to working on some Deliverance type material in the near future with the band. The band released their eighth studio album, titled Corrosion of Conformity, on February 28, 2012, via Candlelight Records.

In September 2012, Corrosion of Conformity posted three pictures from the studio on Facebook, stating that they were working on a five-song EP called Megalodon with Mike Schaefer and John Custer. The entire EP was released for digital download via Scion A/V on November 14, 2012.

By January 2013, Corrosion of Conformity had begun writing new material for their ninth studio album, IX, which was released on July 1, 2014.

Reunion with Pepper Keenan, No Cross No Crown and Mullin's death (2014–present)

In a September 2014 interview with Heavy Blog Is Heavy, drummer Reed Mullin confirmed that Corrosion of Conformity would reunite with guitarist/vocalist Pepper Keenan in 2015 to record a new album, followed by a tour. They planned to begin work on their new album in January 2015.

On January 14, 2015, Corrosion of Conformity announced a six-date UK tour, which took place in March and was their first tour with the Deliverance lineup in 14 years as well their first one with Keenan in nine years. Corrosion of Conformity performed their first show with the re-united Deliverance era lineup of Pepper Keenan, Woody Weatherman, Mike Dean, and Reed Mullin on March 7, 2015, in Manchester, England. Their first US tour with the reunited lineup, supporting Clutch, was announced on July 28, 2015.

On June 6, 2016, Corrosion of Conformity announced the letting go of drummer Reed Mullin after a prolonged battle with alcohol addiction, resulting in a seizure before their concert in Edmonton, Canada on the Lamb of God / Clutch Tour. Mullin returned to the drum stool on the tour on June 8.

On November 10, 2017, the band announced that their tenth studio album, No Cross No Crown, would be released on January 12, 2018. The album's lead single "Cast the First Stone" was premiered on the same day.

Mullin died on January 27, 2020. His replacement was immediately announced to be John Green from Manchester, England, who previously worked as the band's roadie and stepped in as a stand-in in 2019 for numerous shows.

Collaborations and side projects
They have also collaborated with a number of other artists: James Hetfield of Metallica contributed vocals to the song "Man or Ash" on Wiseblood; Warren Haynes of the Allman Brothers' Band and Gov't Mule played slide guitar on "Stare Too Long" on America's Volume Dealer; and Stanton Moore of Galactic played drums on In the Arms of God.

Members of COC have also participated in collaborations: Keenan plays guitar with the metal supergroup Down, and Dean contributed vocals to a track titled "Access Babylon" on Dave Grohl's Probot project. Pepper also appears on Metallica's Garage Inc. cover record, playing guitar and singing the second verse of the Lynyrd Skynyrd song "Tuesday's Gone". He appears in the documentary Some Kind of Monster, auditioning to be Metallica's replacement for Jason Newsted.

Members

Current members
Woody Weatherman – lead guitar, backing vocals (1982–present)
Mike Dean – bass, keyboards, co-lead vocals (lead 1984–1986 and 2006–2015, backing otherwise) (1982–1987, 1993–present)
Pepper Keenan – rhythm guitar, lead vocals (lead since 1993, backing until 1993) (1989–2006, 2015–present)
John Green – drums (2020–present, touring substitute 2018–2020)

Discography

Studio albums

Live albums

Extended plays

Compilation albums

Singles

Music videos
"Vote with a Bullet" (1992)
"Dance of the Dead" (1992)
"Albatross" (1994)
"Clean My Wounds" (1994)
"Drowning in a Daydream" (1996)
"Stone Breaker" (2005)
"The Moneychangers" (2012)
"Psychic Vampire" (2012)
"Feed On" (2012)
"Cast the First Stone" (2017)
"Wolf Named Crow" (2017)
"The Luddite" (2018)

Compilation appearances
No Core tape (1982, No Core)
Why Are We Here? 7" (1983, No Core Records, "Poison Planet", "Indifferent", "Too Cool")
Empty Skulls tape (1984, Fartblossom Enterprises, "Poison Planet", "Eye for an Eye")
Cleanse the Bacteria LP (1985, Pusmort Records, "Kiss of Death")
Thrasher Skate Rock Vol. 3 LP (1986, Thrasher/High Speed Records, "What", "Not for Me", "Citizen")
Empty Skulls Vol. 2 LP (1986, Fartblossom Records, "Center of the World", "Eye for an Eye", "Negative Outlook")
Complete Death LP (1986, Death Records, "Loss for Words")
Life is a Joke Vol. 2 LP (1986, Weird System Records, "Eye for an Eye")
Flipside Vinyl Fanzine Vol. 3 LP (1987, Gasatanka Records, "Intervention")
Rat Music for Rat People 3 LP (1987, CD Presents Records, "Bound")
Clerks soundtrack LP (1994, Columbia Records, "Big Problems")
Nativity in Black: A Tribute to Black Sabbath LP (1994, Columbia Records, "Lord of This World")
UMPF LP (1995, ???, "Clean My Wounds")
It's Our Universe (It's Your Music) LP (1995, Sony Music Special Products, "Clean My Wounds")
Duke Nukem: Music to Score By LP (1999, RED Interactive, "Land of the Free Disease")
Xtreme Rock: Music That Changed Our Lives LP (1999, RED Distribution, "Land of the Free Disease")
Motorcycle Mania 3 CD (2004, Artist Direct BMG, "Thirteen Angels")

References

External links
 
Corrosion of Conformity Gallery on Alberta Stars

1982 establishments in North Carolina
Articles which contain graphical timelines
Candlelight Records artists
Crossover thrash groups
Hardcore punk groups from North Carolina
Heavy metal musical groups from North Carolina
Metal Blade Records artists
Musical groups established in 1982
Musical groups from Raleigh, North Carolina
Musical groups disestablished in 2006
Musical groups reestablished in 2010
Musical quartets
Nuclear Blast artists
American sludge metal musical groups
American stoner rock musical groups
Sanctuary Records artists